Moorina is a rural locality in the local government area (LGA) of Dorset in the North-east LGA region of Tasmania. The 2016 census recorded a population of 11 for the state suburb of Moorina.

Mineral Resources Tasmania have designated a 2km² area of Moorina, to the east of the Tasman Highway, as the Weld River Fossicking Area. The collecting area is known for its sapphire, topaz and zircon specimens.

History 
Moorina was gazetted as a locality in 1969. Originally known as “Krushka’s Bridge", the current name was in use by 1877. Moorina was the sister of Truganini. 

The Krushka brothers built the first bridge over the Ringarooma River. The area was originally settled as a mining town.

Geography
The Ringarooma River forms part of the north-western boundary before flowing through to form part of the northern. The Weld River flows through from south to north, where it joins the Ringarooma River. The Frome River flows through, via the Frome Dam, to join the Weld.

Road infrastructure 
Route A3 (Tasman Highway) passes through from north-west to south-west.

References

Towns in Tasmania
Localities of Dorset Council (Australia)